Bangor Base is a census-designated place (CDP) in Kitsap County, Washington, within U.S. Naval Base Kitsap on the Kitsap Peninsula. Its population was 6,054 at the 2010 census.

Geography 

Demographics 
At the 2000 census, there were 7,253 people, 1,282 households, and 1,275 families in the CDP. The population density is 657.1/mi (253.7/km). There were 1,316 housing units at an average density of 46.0/km (119.2/mi). The racial makeup of the CDP was 76.7% White, 8.1% African American, 1.3% Native American, 4.7% Asian, 0.8% Pacific Islander, 3.9% from other races, and 4.6% from two or more races. Hispanic or Latino of any race were 10.2% of the population.

Of the 1,282 households 79.8% had children under the age of 18 living with them, 93.4% were married couples living together, 4.4% had a female householder with no husband present, and 0.5% were non-families. 0.4% of households were made up of individuals. The average household size was 3.55 and the average family size was 3.54.

The age distribution was 27.5% under the age of 18, 23.4% from 18 to 24, 47.1% from 25 to 44, 2.0% from 45 to 64, and 0.1% 65 or older. The median age was 25 years. For every 100 females, there were 198.0 males. For every 100 females age 18 and over, there were 263.1 males.

The median income for a household in the CDP was $32,246, and the median family income  was $32,105. Males had a median income of $28,856 versus $21,000 for females. The per capita income in the CDP was $16,383. About 8.5% of families and 9.8% of the population were below the poverty line, including 12.4% of those under the age of 18 and none ages 65 or older.

References

External links

 Bangor Tourism Information

Census-designated places in Kitsap County, Washington
Census-designated places in Washington (state)